Mark Pinter (born March 7, 1950) is an American actor best known for his numerous roles in daytime soap operas.

Early life and education
Pinter was born in Decorah, Iowa. He earned a Bachelor of Arts degree in theatre arts from Iowa State University and a Master of Fine Arts from the Hilberry Theatre at Wayne State University.

Career

Acting
Often cast as a villain, Pinter has been a contract player on such shows as Love of Life, Guiding Light, As the World Turns, Loving, and All My Children. His most famous role was that of crooked politician Grant Harrison on Another World (1991–99), for which he won the Soap Opera Digest Award for Best Villain in 1996.

In addition to his work in daytime television, Pinter has guest-starred on numerous primetime television series such as Law & Order and performed extensively on regional theatre stages across the country. He has also appeared in Norman Jewison's Other People's Money and Cameron Crowe's Vanilla Sky. He has starred in the independent films Season of Youth and The Eden Myth.

Directing
Pinter made his directorial debut in 2003 when he directed the world premiere of Jonathan Bell's Portraits at the Union Square Theatre in New York. The play starred Roberta Maxwell and Dana Reeve.

Personal life
Pinter has six children. His daughter, Siri, is married to television and radio host Carson Daly. Pinter was married to fellow soap opera star Colleen Zenk from 1986 to 2010. In 2017, he married communication and marketing strategist Jenie Dahlmann. They reside in San Diego.

Filmography

Film

Television

References

External links

1950 births
American male soap opera actors
Living people
People from Decorah, Iowa
Wayne State University alumni
Male actors from Iowa
20th-century American male actors
21st-century American male actors
American male television actors
American male film actors
American people of Hungarian descent